Kubi Matthu Iyala is a 1992 Indian Kannada-language comedy drama film directed and produced by Sadanand Suvarna and written by Poornachandra Tejaswi based on his own story. The film featured Charuhasan , Raghubir Yadav, Lalithanjali and Vaishali Kasaravalli in the lead roles along with a large number of theater artistes in key supporting roles. The film's music was composed by L. Vaidyanathan and cinematography is G. S. Bhaskar.

The plot revolves around a remote village which is filled with superstitious beliefs and a doctor stationed in the village tries to wipe out all the superstition among the villagers.

The film featured in various film festivals both domestically and internationally. The film also won many awards including Karnataka State and Filmfare Awards.

Cast 

 Charuhasan
 Raghubir Yadav
 Lalithanjali
 Vaishali Kasaravalli
 A. B. Jayaram
 Rudramurthy
 Savanth
 Seetharamachar
 Ashwath Narayana
 A. R. Chandrashekar
 Balakrishna Rai
 B. S. Achar
 Umesh Kasaravalli
 Chidananda

Music 
The score for the film was composed by L. Vaidyanathan and the film had no soundtrack.

Awards and accolades 

Karnataka State Film Awards 1989-90

 Best Film - Sadanand Suvarna
 Best Story - Poornachandra Tejaswi

Filmfare Awards South 1992

 Best Actor - Charuhasan
 2012 - Screened at the Mangalore International Film Festival.

References 

1992 films
1990s Kannada-language films
1992 comedy-drama films
Films based on Indian novels
Indian comedy-drama films
Films scored by L. Vaidyanathan